"Eyes Shut" is a 2015 single by Years & Years. It was produced by Mike Spencer. Two remixes were released on 10 October 2015.

Background
Describing the writing process, Alexander explained that "The song is about self preservation and wanting to hide from disaster. At the time I wrote it I was feeling very depressed so it was a bit more introspective than the other songs. I wrote it to be kind of a personal torch song".

Music video
A music video was produced for the song. It shows frontman Olly Alexander musing the remains of a post-apocalyptic society. It was shot on the outskirts of Bulgaria's capital, Sofia. it was released on 28 September 2015. The director is Chino Moya.

Track listing

Charts and certifications

Weekly charts

Year-end charts

Certifications

References

2015 singles
2015 songs
Polydor Records singles
Synth-pop ballads
Years & Years songs
Songs written by Olly Alexander
Songs written by Mark Ralph (record producer)
Song recordings produced by Mark Ralph (record producer)